Peter Stephan Jungk (born December 19, 1952, in Santa Monica, California) is an American German-speaking novelist.

Life
Jungk is the son of futurologist Robert Jungk. He grew up in the United States and after 1957 in Vienna. From 1968 to 1970 he attended the Rudolf-Steiner-School in Berlin. He lived in Salzburg from 1970 till he took his Matura in 1972. In 1973 Jungk worked with the theater of Basel as an assistant director. From 1974 to 1976 he studied at the American Film Institute in Los Angeles.

From 1976 to 1979 he lived in Salzburg again. In 1979 he worked with Peter Handke on filming Handke's The Left-Handed Woman (Die linkshändige Frau)as an assistant director. In 1980 Jungk attended a Torah school in Jerusalem. He moved back to Vienna in 1981. Since 1988 he is living in Paris with his wife, photographer . In 1994 their daughter Adah Dylan was born.

Jungk is an author of novels, essays and scripts. In some cases he also directed the movie version of his own works. Besides that he translates from English.

In January 2013 the opera The Perfect American by Philip Glass, based on Jungk's novel , premiered at the Teatro Real in Madrid.

Jungk is a member of the Austrian PEN Club.

Awards 
 2001: 
 2011: Buchpreis der Salzburger Wirtschaft

Publications

As author 
 . Frankfurt am Main 1978
 . Frankfurt am Main 1981
 Franz Werfel, Frankfurt am Main 1987; translated as Franz Werfel: A Life in Prague, Vienna and Hollywood (1990)
 Tigor. Frankfurt am Main 1991
 . Heidelberg 1994 (with Lillian Birnbaum)
 . Munich 1996
 . (The Inheritance) Munich 1999
 . (The Perfect American) Stuttgart 2001
  (Crossing the Hudson) Stuttgart 2005
  (The electric heart), Vienna 2011
  (The dark rooms of Edith Tudor Hart – a life's stories), Frankfurt, 2015

As editor 
 Das Franz-Werfel-Buch, Frankfurt am Main 1986

As translator 
 Woody Allen: . Frankfurt am Main 1989
 Christopher Durang: . Frankfurt am Main 1987
 Christopher Durang: . Frankfurt am Main 1989
 Raymond Fitzsimons: Edmund Kean. Frankfurt am Main 1987
 Gabriel Gbadamosi: Hotel Orpheu. Frankfurt am Main 1994
 Thornton Wilder: . Frankfurt am Main 1999
 Thornton Wilder: . Frankfurt am Main 1999
 Thornton Wilder: . Frankfurt am Main 1999
 Thornton Wilder: . Frankfurt am Main 1999

Documentaries 
 Franz Werfel –  (ZDF/ORF, 1988)
 Leo Perutz –  (ZDF/ORF, 1989)
  –  (ZDF/ORF, 1992)
 André Previn –  (Dor-Film, 2008)
 Tracking Edith (peartree-entertainment, 2016)

References

External links
 
 
 Jungk's homepage at the University of Alabama
 "Hi-Ho, Hi- Huh? Philip Glass Does Disney" by Dave Itzkoff, The New York Times, September 29, 2008
  The Perfect American / by Peter Stephan Jungk, Michael Hofmann (Translation) goodreads.com 2004

American people of Austrian-Jewish descent
1952 births
Living people
Writers from Santa Monica, California
Writers from Vienna
Writers from Paris
20th-century American translators
21st-century American translators